The 1971 Humboldt State Lumberjacks football team represented Humboldt State College during the 1971 NCAA College Division football season. Humboldt State competed in the Far Western Conference (FWC).

The 1971 Lumberjacks were led by sixth-year head coach Bud Van Deren. They played home games at the Redwood Bowl in Arcata, California. Humboldt State finished with a record of seven wins and four losses (7–4, 3–3 FWC). The Lumberjacks outscored their opponents 288–209 for the season.

Schedule

Notes

References

Humboldt State
Humboldt State Lumberjacks football seasons
Humboldt State Lumberjacks football